Belote may refer to:

Card games
Belote, a card game popular in France

People
Frank Belote, an American track and field athlete who competed in the 1912 Summer Olympics
Melissa Belote, an American swimmer and gold medalist form the 1972 Olympics